Selma A. Cook (born 1961) is managing editor of the Youth Section and Volunteer Youth Resource Network at IslamOnline.

Life
She became a Muslim in 1988 in her native country of Australia. She migrated to Egypt in 1993.

She has written a book about her journey to Islam called ‘The Miracles of My Life,’ an Islamic poetry book called ‘The Light of Submission,’ as well as the Miss Moppy series (Islamic stories for children). She has recently published her first Islamic novel for teenagers called ‘Buried Treasure’ which is the first in the ‘Amirah Stevenson series'.
She writes articles and poetry on her Website The Islamic Garden.

She works for Hoda, a Cairo-based satellite channel.

Selma Cook said: 
When you are filled with stress and uncertainty, black and white is very good, it's very easy to manage....They want to make sure everything is authentic.

Works
 "A Gentle Nature So Hard to Find", oneummah

Edited

Anthologies

References

1964 births
Living people
21st-century Australian novelists
Australian non-fiction writers
Australian poets
Australian Muslims
Australian women novelists
Australian women poets
21st-century Australian women writers